Terebratulina gracilis, also called Spirifer gracilis, is an extinct species of brachiopods. The fossils are present in the lower Cretaceous.

References 

Prehistoric brachiopods
Terebratulida